Zoya Sergeyevna Ananchenko (born September 5, 1996) is a Kazakhstani sprint canoeist. 

Ananchenko competed at the 2016 Summer Olympics in the women's K-1 500 metres race, in which she reached the semifinals, and as part of the tenth-place Kazakhstan team in the women's K-4 500 metres race.

References

External links
 
 

1996 births
Living people
Kazakhstani female canoeists
Olympic canoeists of Kazakhstan
Canoeists at the 2016 Summer Olympics
Asian Games silver medalists for Kazakhstan
Asian Games bronze medalists for Kazakhstan
Asian Games medalists in canoeing
Canoeists at the 2014 Asian Games
Canoeists at the 2018 Asian Games
Medalists at the 2014 Asian Games
Medalists at the 2018 Asian Games
21st-century Kazakhstani women